The 1968 Spanish Grand Prix was a Formula One motor race held at Jarama Circuit on 12 May 1968. It was race 2 of 12 in both the 1968 World Championship of Drivers and the 1968 International Cup for Formula One Manufacturers. It was the first race after the death of former double World Champion Jim Clark, who had died in a non-championship Formula Two event in Hockenheim, Germany the previous month. Clark had led the drivers' championship before this race, on 9 points, after he won in the first race in South Africa.

Background 
Following Jim Clark's death in Germany, and the death of his replacement Mike Spence during practice for the Indianapolis 500 just five days before the race, team principal Colin Chapman opted not to come to Spain for the first championship Spanish Grand Prix since 1954, still being devastated by the losses. Graham Hill was the only works Lotus driver; a second car was entered for Jackie Oliver but could not be set up in time.  The race saw the first appearance of Team Lotus in the red, gold and white colors of Imperial Tobacco's Gold Leaf brand as their title sponsor instead of the traditional British racing green, making them the first works team (second only to Team Gunston entering a private Brabham car at the 1968 South African Grand Prix) to paint their cars in the livery of their sponsors. Jackie Stewart was absent due to a wrist injury he sustained while driving in a Formula Two race, so it was up to Jean-Pierre Beltoise to debut the new Matra MS10.

Report 
During qualifying, Ferrari's Chris Amon took his first ever pole position with Graham Hill for the mourning Team Lotus down in sixth place.

Lotus fate turned however during the race on Sunday, contested in searing heat. Pedro Rodríguez took the lead at the start in his BRM, followed by Beltoise, Amon and Hulme. The Frenchman moved into the lead on lap 12, only to drop back four laps later with engine troubles. Amon was now back in the lead, followed closely by Rodriguez until the Mexican spun and crashed on lap 28. While he waited for his mechanics to pick up the car, spectators "descended on the car like vultures and stripped off the mirrors, seat, windscreen and nose cowling". These retirements elevated Hill to second place behind Amon, who suffered a fuel pump failure on lap 58, handing Hill, who had been a mile behind, first place and victory. Hulme was close behind Hill, but when his McLaren lost second gear, he needed to back off and the Englishman cruised home. Beltoise recovered from his mechanical troubles and recorded the fastest lap of the race.

Classification

Qualifying

Race

Championship standings after the race

Drivers' Championship standings

Constructors' Championship standings

 Note: Only the top five positions are included for both sets of standings.

References

Further reading
 

Spanish Grand Prix
Spanish Grand Prix
1968 in Spanish motorsport
Spanish